The 1952–53 Tercera División season was the 17th since its establishment.

Format 
99 clubs participated in 6 geographic groups. One club, Tomelloso CF, withdrew at the start of the season. The 6 group winners were promoted to the Segunda División. The 6 runners-up joined the teams in 12th and 13th place in Segunda División Grupo I and the team in 13th place in Segunda División Grupo II to form one play-off group of 5 teams (Grupo I) and another of 4 teams (Grupo II). The winner and runner up of Grupo I earned a place in the Segunda División as did the winner of Grupo II. The 12th team in Segunda División Grupo II played off against Tenerife, champions of the Canarias Regional League (not part of the Tercera División).

League tables

Group I

Group II

Group III

Group IV

Group V

Group VI

Promotion playoff

Group I

Note: Gimnástica de Torrelavega retained their place in the Segunda División and Cultural Leonesa were promoted. UD Salamanca were later reprieved from relegation following the withdrawal of CD San Andrés from the Segunda División.

Group II

Note: España de Tánger were promoted to the Segunda División.

Group III

Note: CD Tenerife were promoted to the Segunda División.

Season records
 Most wins: 23, Eibar and Escoriaza.
 Most draws: 10, Arenas de Getxo and Alicante.
 Most losses: 31, Tàrrega.
 Most goals for: 106, Escoriaza.
 Most goals against: 117, Tàrrega.
 Most points: 52, Eibar.
 Fewest wins: 2, Tàrrega and Atlético Malagueño.
 Fewest draws: 1, Tàrrega, Iliturgi, San Fernando and Úbeda.
 Fewest losses: 4, Badajoz.
 Fewest goals for: 24, Conquense.
 Fewest goals against: 27, La Felguera.
 Fewest points: 3, Tàrrega.

Notes

External links
RSSSF 
Futbolme 
Research by Asociación para la Recopilación de Estadísticas del Fútbol (AREFE)

Tercera División seasons
3
Spain